Ruby Wright may refer to: 

Ruby Wright (big band-era singer) (Ruby Rapp, 1914-2004), wife of Barney Rapp
Ruby Wright (country singer) (Ruby Wells, 1939-2009), daughter of Johnnie Wright and Kitty Wells